Dörrenbach is a municipality in the Südliche Weinstraße district, in Rhineland-Palatinate, Germany.

References

Municipalities in Rhineland-Palatinate
Palatinate Forest
Südliche Weinstraße